The Royal Canadian Infantry Corps is the infantry corps of the Canadian Army and includes regular and reserve force regiments.

Originally formed as the Canadian Infantry Corps on 2 September 1942 to encompass all existing infantry regiments, including regiments of foot guards, in the Canadian Army. The corps was granted its "royal" designation in 1947 and was designated Royal Canadian Infantry Corps 30 April 1947, to be redesignated The Royal Canadian Infantry Corps 22 March 1948, and revert to Royal Canadian Infantry Corps 17 February 1964.

The badge of the Royal Canadian Infantry Corps consists of Argent three maple leaves conjoined on one stem within an annulus Gules fimbriated and inscribed INFANTRY •  in letters Or, the whole ensigned by the Royal Crown proper set above a scroll Or inscribed with the Motto in letters Sable and surmounted by two rifles in saltire Or.  The three maple leaves conjoined on one stem, taken from the Royal Arms of Canada, represent service to Canada, and the Crown, service to the sovereign. The crossed rifles denote infantry and have been used in badges of infantry units as well as of the officer cadet programme. Red and white are the national colours of Canada. "INFANTRY" and "" are a form of the bilingual branch title and "" is the motto of the corps.

In 1968, with the unification of the Canadian Army into the Canadian Armed Forces, the name of the Royal Canadian Infantry Corps was changed to simply the "Infantry Branch".  As of April 2013, the traditional designation "Royal Canadian Infantry Corps" has been officially restored.  Today, the administration and training of both the regular and reserve infantry that form part of the Canadian Army is the responsibility of the Infantry School, which runs officer classification courses as well as NCO and Warrant Officer trades training at CFB Gagetown.

Role
To close with and destroy the enemy.

Tasks
 To destroy the enemy in close combat
 To defend a position by the holding of ground
 To fight as covering force troops
 To act as all or part of a reserve to counter-attack or block
 To participate in airmobile, airborne and amphibious operations
 To establish surveillance and conduct patrols
 To conduct security tasks, including rear area security
 To exploit the effects of nuclear, biological and chemical weapons

Regular Force
The 3rd Battalion Royal Canadian Regiment is the sole airmobile battalion of the Regular Force. The two other regular force regiments both retain a parachute company in their respective 3rd battalions.

After the Second World War the infantry was expanded to meet Canada's global responsibilities as part of NATO. Initially, the militia regiments provided men to a number of composite battalions:

In 1953 it was decided  that the composite battalions would be regimented. The two Canadian Infantry battalions were amalgamated with the 3rd Battalions of both The Royal Canadian Regiment and Princess Patricia's Canadian Light Infantry to form a new, four battalion regiment of foot guards, The Canadian Guards. The Rifle and Highland battalions were regimented by forming Regular Force units of the senior rifle and highland regiments of the Militia, The Queen's Own Rifles of Canada and The Black Watch (Royal Highland Regiment) of Canada.

Reserve

Supplementary Order of Battle
Regiments on the Supplementary Order of Battle legally exist but have no personnel or materiel.

Order of precedence

See also 

 Royal Australian Infantry Corps
 Monarchy of Canada
 List of infantry weapons and equipment of the Canadian military
 List of equipment of the Canadian Army
 Supplementary Order of Battle

External links
Canadian Forces Recruiting
Canadian Forces and Department of National Defence
List of Canadian organizations with royal patronage
Monarchy of Canada
 List of Civilian organizations with prefix "Royal" - Heritage Canada.
 List of civilian organizations with the prefix "royal" prepared by the Department of Canadian Heritage

References

Canadian Armed Forces personnel branches
Administrative corps of the Canadian Army
Organizations based in Canada with royal patronage
Infantry units and formations of Canada
Military units and formations established in 1942
Army units and formations of Canada in World War II